Papovaviricetes is a class of viruses. The class shares the name of an abolished family, Papovaviridae, which was split in 1999 into the two families Papillomaviridae and Polyomaviridae. The class was established in 2019 and takes its name from the former family.

Orders
The following orders are recognized:

 Sepolyvirales
 Zurhausenvirales

See also
 Bandicoot papillomatosis carcinomatosis virus

References

Viruses